The Elephant Sleeps But Still Remembers is a live album by American jazz musician Jack DeJohnette recorded together with Bill Frisell.

Personnel 
 Jack DeJohnette – drums, percussion, vocals, piano, producer
 Bill Frisell – guitar, banjo

References 

Jack DeJohnette live albums
2006 live albums